In geometry, the great truncated icosidodecahedron (or great quasitruncated icosidodecahedron or stellatruncated icosidodecahedron) is a nonconvex uniform polyhedron, indexed as U68. It has 62 faces (30 squares, 20 hexagons, and 12 decagrams), 180 edges, and 120 vertices. It is given a Schläfli symbol t0,1,2, and Coxeter-Dynkin diagram, .

Cartesian coordinates 
Cartesian coordinates for the vertices of a great truncated icosidodecahedron centered at the origin are all the even permutations of
 (±τ, ±τ, ±(3−1/τ)),
 (±2τ, ±1/τ, ±τ−3),
 (±τ, ±1/τ2, ±(1+3/τ)),
 (±, ±2, ±/τ) and
 (±1/τ, ±3, ±2/τ),
where τ = (1+)/2 is the golden ratio.

Related polyhedra

Great disdyakis triacontahedron 

The great disdyakis triacontahedron (or trisdyakis icosahedron) is a nonconvex isohedral polyhedron. It is the dual of the great truncated icosidodecahedron. Its faces are triangles.

Proportions 
The dihedral angle equals . Part of each triangle lies within the solid, hence is invisible in solid models.

See also 
 List of uniform polyhedra

References

 p. 96

External links 
 
 

Uniform polyhedra